Universal Robina Corporation (URC) is a Philippine company based in Quezon City, Philippines. It is one of the largest food and beverage companies in the Philippines.

URC is a core subsidiary of JG Summit Holdings, Inc. (JGSHI) which is one of the largest business conglomerates listed in the Philippine Stock Exchange.

History

The precursor to Universal Robina Corporation (URC) was founded on September 28, 1954 by John Gokongwei, Jr. Gokongwei decided to construct a corn milling plant to produce glucose and cornstarch, Universal Corn Products (UCP).

Later, to diversify by producing and marketing his own branded consumer foods, in 1961, Consolidated Food Corporation was established. Their first product was Blend 45, the first locally manufactured coffee blend, dubbed as the “Pinoy coffee”. This became the largest-selling coffee brand in the market, even beating market leaders Café Puro and Nescafé. After coffee, came Nips chocolate candies, a panned chocolate similar to M&M's, was a staple of Filipino childhood.

In 1963, Robina Farms began operations beginning with poultry products. This was also the beginning of the vertical integration of the Gokongwei businesses, as the farms would be able to purchase feeds from UCP in the future. Later that decade, Robichem Laboratories would be put up, to cater to the veterinary needs of the farms businesses. Robina Farms expanded as it entered the hogs business in the latter part of the 70s.

1966 saw the establishment of Universal Robina Corporation, which pioneered the savory snacks industry in the Philippines with its Jack 'n Jill snacks - Potato Chips, Chiz Curls (puffed corn snack) and Chippy (corn chips). Other snack products would follow, like Jack 'n Jill Pretzels (pretzels), Piattos (fabricated potato chips), and Maxx (hard candy), followed by Magic Flakes, and different flavors Magic Creams cracker sandwich; lastly they added such confectionery item X.O. Butter Caramel Candy, and more.

In the early 1970s, the Gokongwei family entered the commodities business through the formation of Continental Milling Corporation, for flour milling and production. The late 1980s brought the acquisition of three sugar mills and refineries, under URC Sugar. These two businesses provided stable cash flows, and allowed for further vertical integration in the supply chain. In line with this strategy, the late 1990s saw the entry of URC into the plastics business, through URC Packaging.

In 2005, the present structure of the group was adopted, organized under Universal Robina Corporation, divided into three focused groups:

 the Branded Consumer Foods Group, composed of BCFG Domestic (including packaging) and URC International, for the production and sale of snacks, beverage, and grocery products,
 the Agro-Industrial Group, composed of Universal Corn Products, Robina Farms, and Robichem, for the production and sale of animal feeds, day-old chicks, hogs, and veterinary medicine,
 and the Commodity Foods Group, with the Sugar and Flour divisions, for the production of flour and sugar, and for sugar milling and refining services.

In 2014, Universal Robina expanded to Oceania by acquiring New Zealand-based biscuit company, Griffin's Foods. This was followed by the acquisition of Snack Brands Australia in 2016. In December 2019, Universal Robina and German company Intersnack formed Unisnack ANZ, a joint venture comprising Griffin's Foods and Snack Brands Australia. Intersnack held a 40% stake in the consolidated business. In August 2021, Universal Robina exited the Australian and New Zealand market by selling its remaining 60% stake in Unisnack ANZ to Intersnack.

In November 2021, Universal Robina entered an agreement to purchase Malaysia-based Munchy's from CVC Capital Partners for US$454 million.

Presence
Universal Robina is based in Quezon City and as of 2018 has 19 production sites in the Philippines. It also has production sites in China, Myanmar, Thailand, Vietnam, Malaysia and Indonesia. The company also maintains an exclusive distributor presence in Laos and Cambodia, as well as sales offices in Hong Kong and Singapore.

Sports
URC owned the Philippine Basketball Association franchise Great Taste Coffee Makers which played from the inaugural 1975 season to 1992 when the company sold the team to Sta. Lucia Realty. The Coffee Makers won six PBA championships.

See also

John Gokongwei
JG Summit Holdings

References

External links
 

 
Confectionery companies of the Philippines
Snack food manufacturers of the Philippines
Drink companies of the Philippines
Philippine chocolate companies
Coffee companies of the Philippines
Food and drink companies of the Philippines
Food and drink companies established in 1954
Companies listed on the Philippine Stock Exchange
Companies based in Quezon City
1954 establishments in the Philippines